Epistrophe  is a genus of flies in the family Syrphidae, the hoverflies or flower flies.

These are medium-sized flies that live in forest habitat, where they occur on forest edges and in openings. The larvae are usually flat and green, blending in with foliage. The larvae are often predators of aphids, and adult females may lay their eggs in aphid colonies to provide the larvae with a food source. After an eight-day larval stage the juvenile fly enters diapause and then pupates the following spring.

Species
There are nearly 75 species in the genus. Species include:

Epistrophe annulitarsis (Stackelberg, 1918)
Epistrophe cryptica Doczkal & Schmid, 1994
Epistrophe diaphana (Zetterstedt, 1843)
Epistrophe eligans (Harris, 1780)
Epistrophe flava Doczkal & Schmid, 1994
Epistrophe grossulariae (Meigen, 1822)
Epistrophe leiophthalma (Schiner & Egger, 1853)
Epistrophe melanostoma (Zetterstedt, 1843)
Epistrophe metcalfi (Fluke, 1933)
Epistrophe nitidicollis (Meigen, 1822)
Epistrophe obscuripes (Strobl, 1910)
Epistrophe ochrostoma (Zetterstedt, 1849)
Epistrophe terminalis (Curran, 1925)
Epistrophe xanthostoma (Williston, 1887)

References

Diptera of Europe
Diptera of North America
Syrphinae
Syrphini
Hoverfly genera
Taxa named by Francis Walker (entomologist)